Trigonisca duckei is a species of eusocial stingless bee in the family Apidae and tribe Meliponini.

See also 
 Leurotrigona muelleri

References 

Meliponini
Hymenoptera of South America
Hymenoptera of Brazil
Insects described in 1900